Ochrimnus is a genus of seed bugs in the family Lygaeidae. There are more than 40 described species in Ochrimnus.

Species
These species belong to the genus Ochrimnus:

 Ochrimnus barberi (Slater, 1964)
 Ochrimnus bellissimus Brailovsky, 1982
 Ochrimnus bracensis Baranowski & Slater, 1998
 Ochrimnus carnosulus (Van Duzee, 1914)
 Ochrimnus cellus Brailovsky, 1982
 Ochrimnus chontalensis (Distant, 1893)
 Ochrimnus cinctipennis (Stal, 1858)
 Ochrimnus collaris (Fabricius, 1803)
 Ochrimnus conjunctus (Distant, 1882)
 Ochrimnus consanguinitas (Distant, 1882)
 Ochrimnus cophinus Brailovsky, 1982
 Ochrimnus dallasi (Guerin-Meneville, 1857)
 Ochrimnus dimorphopterus Brailovsky, 1982
 Ochrimnus disseptus (Stal, 1874)
 Ochrimnus foederatus (Van Duzee, 1929)
 Ochrimnus gerulus Brailovsky, 1982
 Ochrimnus henryi Brailovsky, 1982
 Ochrimnus interstinctus (Distant, 1882)
 Ochrimnus laevus Brailovsky, 1982
 Ochrimnus languidus Brailovsky, 1982
 Ochrimnus limbatipennis (Stal, 1858)
 Ochrimnus lineoloides (Slater, 1964)
 Ochrimnus luteolus Brailovsky, 1982
 Ochrimnus lynceus Brailovsky, 1982
 Ochrimnus marginatus Baranowski, 2005
 Ochrimnus marquezi Brailovsky, 1982
 Ochrimnus mimulus (Stal, 1874)
 Ochrimnus mirum Brailovsky, 1982
 Ochrimnus naevillus Brailovsky, 2021
 Ochrimnus neotropicalis (Kirkaldy, 1909)
 Ochrimnus nigriceps (Scudder, 1958)
 Ochrimnus nigrosteolaris Brailovsky, 2021
 Ochrimnus nitidulus Brailovsky, 1982
 Ochrimnus obsoletus (Stal, 1858)
 Ochrimnus pallescens (Stal, 1862)
 Ochrimnus pallidocinctus (Stal, 1862)
 Ochrimnus pseudocollaris Brailovsky, 1982
 Ochrimnus rabidus Brailovsky, 1982
 Ochrimnus rostratum Brailovsky, 2021
 Ochrimnus sagax Brailovsky, 1982
 Ochrimnus scalprum Brailovsky, 1982
 Ochrimnus sceptrum Brailovsky, 1982
 Ochrimnus schizus Brailovsky, 1982
 Ochrimnus somnus Brailovsky, 1982
 Ochrimnus succineus Brailovsky, 1982
 Ochrimnus testatus Brailovsky, 1982
 Ochrimnus tripligatus (Barber, 1914)

References

Further reading

External links

 

Lygaeidae